Tangfeifania is a Gram-negative, facultatively anaerobic and non-motile genus of bacteria from the family of Prolixibacteraceae with one known species (Tangfeifania diversioriginum). Tangfeifania diversioriginum has been isolated from the saltwater lake Gahai in China.

References

Bacteroidia
Bacteria genera
Monotypic bacteria genera
Taxa described in 2014